The 2005 Emerald Bowl, part of the 2005–06 NCAA bowl game season, was played on December 29, 2005, at AT&T Park in San Francisco, California. It featured the Georgia Tech Yellow Jackets, and the Utah Utes.

Game summary
Utah - Travis LaTendresse 14 yard touchdown pass from Brett Ratliff (Dan Beardall kick failed) 
Utah - Travis LaTendresse 23 yard touchdown pass from Brett Ratliff (Dan Beardall kick)
Utah - Travis LaTendresse 25 yard touchdown pass from Brett Ratliff (Dan Beardall kick)
Georgia Tech - George Cooper 31 yard touchdown pass from Reggie Ball (Travis Bell kick)
Georgia Tech - Travis Bell 29 yard field goal
Utah - Dan Beardall 23 yard field goal
Utah - Travis LaTendresse 16 touchdown yard pass from Brett Ratliff (Travis LaTendresse pass from Brett Ratliff)
Utah - Quinton Ganther 41 yard touchdown run (Dan Beardall kick)

Utah took a 6–0 lead with 12:26 left in the first quarter, following a 14-yard touchdown pass from Brett Ratliff to wide receiver Travis LaTendresse. With 3:59 left in the first quarter, Ratliff again found LaTendresse, this time for a 23-yard score, and Utah increased its lead to 13–0.

Just 30 seconds into the third quarter, Ratliff found LaTendresse for a third time, connecting on a 25-yard touchdown pass, as Utah opened up a 20–0 lead. Georgia Tech attempted to claw its way back in the game, after Reggie Ball threw a 31-yard touchdown pass to George Cooper, cutting Utah's lead to 20–7. With 3 seconds left in the half, Travis Bell kicked a 29-yard field goal, to make the halftime score 20–10 Utah.

In the third quarter, Dan Beardall added a 23-yard field goal, increasing Utah's lead to 23–10. With 11:44 left in the game, Ratliff found LaTendresse for the fourth time in the game, throwing a 16-yard touchdown pass, giving Utah a 31–10 lead. Quinton Ganther's 41-yard touchdown run sealed the deal, as Utah went on to win 38–10.

References

External links
 Game summary at ESPN
 Game summary at USA Today

Emerald Bowl
Redbox Bowl
Georgia Tech Yellow Jackets football bowl games
Utah Utes football bowl games
Emerald Bowl
December 2005 sports events in the United States
2005 in San Francisco